Hilversum is a railway station in Hilversum, Netherlands. It located on the Amsterdam Centraal station – Amersfoort station part of the Amsterdam–Zutphen railway, with a branch to Utrecht Centraal station. There are two other stations in Hilversum: Hilversum Media Park to the north, and Hilversum Sportpark to the south.

History
The station opened on 10 June 1874. The station was situated on the so-called Gooilijn, part of the Amsterdam–Zutphen railway. Other connections were added later. The current building was constructed in 1992 and, apart from the railway station, it used to also houses offices of the regional Tax and Customs Administration. These have been replaced by offices of Transdev, BrightBlue, PareX Parts Exchange and other companies.

Intercity services at Hilversum were suspended in 1995. After constructing extra platforms, intercity services were resumed on 10 December 2007. All passing passenger trains now call at Hilversum.

Train services
The following train services call at Hilversum:
7 daily intercity services Amsterdam - Amersfoort - Hengelo - Osnabrück - Hanover - Berlin
1x per hour intercity services Schiphol - Amersfoort - Hengelo - Enschede
1x per hour intercity service Schiphol - Hilversum - Amersfoort Schothorst
2x per hour intercity service Enkhuizen - Hoorn - Amsterdam - Hilversum - Amersfoort (- Deventer)
2x per hour local service (sprinter) Utrecht - Hilversum - Almere
2x per hour local service (sprinter) The Hague - Leiden - Hoofddorp - Schiphol - Duivendrecht - Hilversum - Utrecht
2x per hour local service (sprinter) Hoofddorp - Schiphol - Amsterdam - Hilversum - Amersfoort

Bus services

Local bus lines

Regional bus lines

External links
NS website 
Dutch Public Transport journey planner 

Railway stations in North Holland
Railway stations opened in 1874
Railway station Hilversum
1874 establishments in the Netherlands
Railway stations in the Netherlands opened in the 19th century